PC-Write was a computer word processor and was one of the first three widely popular software products sold via the marketing method that became known as shareware. It was originally written by Bob Wallace in early 1983.

Overview
PC-Write was a modeless editor, using control characters and special function keys to perform various editing operations. By default it accepted many of the same control key commands as WordStar while adding many of its own features. It could produce plain ASCII text files, but there were also features that embedded control characters in a document to support automatic section renumbering, bold and italic fonts, and other such; also, a feature that was useful in list processing (as used in Auto LISP) was its ability to find matching open and closed parenthesis "( )"; this matching operation also worked for the other paired characters: { }, [ ] and < >.

Lines beginning with particular control characters n

and/or a period (.) contained commands that were evaluated when the document was printed, e.g. to specify margin sizes, select elite or pica type, or to specify the number of lines of text that would fit on a page, such as in escape sequences.

While Quicksoft distributed copies of PC-Write for $10, the company encouraged users to make copies of the program for others in an early example of shareware. Quicksoft asked those who liked PC-Write to send it $75. The sum provided a printed manual (notable for its many pictures of cats, drawn by Megan Dana-Wallace), telephone technical support, source code, and a registration number that the user entered into his copy of the program. If anyone else paid the company $75 to purchase an already-registered copy of the software, the company paid a $25 commission back to the original registrant, and then issued a new number to the new buyer, thereby giving a financial incentive for buyers to distribute and promote the software. 

A configuration file allowed customizing PC-Write, including remapping the keyboard. Later versions of the registered (paid for) version of the program included a thesaurus (which was not shareware) along with the editor. In addition, there was vocabulary available in other languages, such as in German. Utilities were also provided to convert PC-Write files to and from other file formats that were common at the time. One limitation of the software was its inability to print directly from memory - because the print function was a separate subprogram, a document must be saved to a file before it could be printed.

Bob Wallace found that running Quicksoft used so much of his time he could not improve the PC-Write software. In early 1991, he sold the firm to another Microsoft alumnus, Leo Nikora, the original product manager for Windows 1.0 (1983–1985). Wallace returned to full programming and an updated version of PC-Write was released in June 1991.

One unusual feature of PC-Write was its implementation of free form editing: it could copy and paste a block of text anywhere.  For instance, if one had a block of information, one per line, in the format Name (spaces) Address, one could highlight only the addresses section and paste that into the right-hand part of a page. Today, Emacs and jEdit are also capable of performing this function.

When the market changed to multi-program software (office suites combining word processing, spreadsheet, and database programs), Quicksoft went out of business in 1993.

The first Trojan horse (appearing in 1986), PC-Write Trojan, masqueraded as "version 2.72" of the shareware word processor PC-Write. Quicksoft did not release a version 2.72.

PC-Write had one of the first "as you type", in "real-time mode" spell checker; earlier spell checkers only worked in "batch mode".

The Brown Bag Word Processor
is based on 
PC-Write's source code,
licensed by Brown Bag Software,
with some minor modifications and additions.

Reception
PC Magazine stated that version 1.3 of "PC-Write rates extremely well and compares favorably with many word processors costing much more". It cited very fast performance, good use of color, and availability of source code as advantages, while lack of built-in support for printing bold or underline and keyboard macros was a disadvantage. Compute! complimented the software's "clean implementation of standard editing features", cited its "truly staggering" level of customization, and after mentioning a few flaws stated that they should be "viewed in context of the program's overall excellence".

See also
Andrew Fluegelman
Jim Knopf, also known as Jim Button
PC-File
PC-Talk

References

External links
PC-WRITE: Quality Word Processing at a Price That's Hard to Beat Review of PC-Write in COMPUTERS and COMPOSITION 2(4), August 1985, page 78.

1983 software
Shareware
Word processors
DOS text editors